The governor-general of Australia is the head of the executive branch of the federal government, serving as the representative of the Australian monarch (currently Charles III). The position came into being with the adoption of the new national constitution on 1 January 1901, and has been held by 27 people since then. Governors-general have no fixed term, but have usually served for around five years.

Background 
For the first two decades after federation, governors-general were selected solely by the British government. The monarch was consulted on the decision into the 1930s. The first four governors-general were peers; Sir Ronald Munro Ferguson (appointed 1914) was the first commoner to hold the position, although he was also later elevated to the peerage. In 1920, Billy Hughes became the first prime minister to be consulted over the governor-generalship. Stanley Bruce (1925) and Joseph Lyons (1935) either asked for or were given a list of suitable candidates to choose from.

James Scullin (1930) became the first prime minister of Australia to exercise complete discretion in the appointment; his nomination of Sir Isaac Isaacs made Australia the first Dominion to have a native-born governor-general. In 1945, John Curtin nominated Prince Henry, Duke of Gloucester, to the post – the first and only royal officeholder. A second Australian (William McKell) was appointed in 1947; he was followed by three more Britons, each chosen by Sir Robert Menzies. Menzies's fourth nomination was Richard Casey, who took office in 1965; he and all subsequent governors-general have been Australian citizens. All states except South Australia and Tasmania have provided at least one appointee. The first female governor-general, Quentin Bryce, took office in 2008.

On 16 December 2018, prime minister Scott Morrison announced that the next governor-general would be General David Hurley, then-governor of New South Wales. To provide continuity through general elections both federally and in New South Wales, Hurley succeeded General Sir Peter Cosgrove, who had planned to retire in March 2019, on 1 July 2019.

List of officeholders

See also
History of Australia
Constitutional history of Australia
Governors of the Australian states
British Empire
Governor-general (links to other countries which have governors-general)

Notes

Further reading
 
  (pp 515, 519, 548)

External links
 The Office of the Governor-General
 The use of the reserve powers
 A Mirror to the People a 58-minute documentary film on the Office of Governor-General of Australia 1999. Dir: Daryl Dellora. Features Sir William Deane, Sir Zelman Cowen, Sir Ninian Stephen. Special Commendation ATOM Awards.

Lists of governors-general
 
Australia
Westminster system
Governors-general
Governors-general
Governors-general

es:Gobernador General de Australia